Egberto Amin Gismonti (born 5 December 1947) is a Brazilian composer, guitarist and pianist.

Biography 

Gismonti was born in the small city of Carmo, state of Rio de Janeiro, Brazil, into a musical family. His mother was from Sicily and his father was from Beirut, Lebanon. At the age of six, he started studying the piano at the Brazilian Conservatory of Music. After studying the classical repertoire in Brazil for 15 years, he went to Paris, France, to delve into modern music. He studied with Nadia Boulanger (1887–1979), after acceptance as a student by the composer Jean Barraqué, a student of Anton Webern and Schoenberg. Boulanger encouraged Gismonti to write the collective Brazilian experience into his music.

Gismonti is a self-taught guitarist. After returning to Brazil, he designed guitars with more than six strings, expanding the possibilities of the instrument. Approaching the fretboard as if it were a keyboard, Gismonti gives the impression that there is more than a single guitar player. Gismonti's sojourn in the Xingu region of the Amazon basin made a lasting impression. This is documented musically in tunes such as "Yualapeti" and "Sapain" (Yualapeti shaman, Sapain) and in the recordings Dança das Cabeças ("Dance of the Heads", 1977), Sol do Meio-Dia ("Noon Sun", 1978), which he dedicated to the Xingu, and Duas Vozes ("Two Voices", 1984).

The musical career of Gismonti spans five decades. The major phases are distinguished by record company, the ensemble format, and the musical collaborators. The most important ensembles are his Brazilian group Academia de Danças, including Mauro Senise (saxophone and flutes), Zeca Assumpção (bass) and Nenê (Realcino Lima Filho, drums and percussion), the duo with Naná Vasconcelos (percussion), and the trio with Charlie Haden (bass) and Jan Garbarek (saxophone).  Dança das Cabecas, the first ECM record, was nominated "Album of the Year" by Stereo Review and received the 1977 Großer Deutscher Schallplattenpreis.

Discography 
 Egberto Gismonti (Elenco, 1969)  
 Sonho '70 (Polydor, 1970)
 Orfeo Novo (MPS, 1970) 
 Água e Vinho (EMI-Odeon, 1972)
 Egberto Gismonti (EMI-Odeon, 1973) 
 Árvore (Decca/ECM, 1973)
 Academia de Danças (EMI, 1974)  
 Corações Futuristas (Odeon, 1976) 
 Carmo (EMI, 1977) 
 Dança das Cabeças, with Naná Vasconcelos (ECM, 1977)
 Nó Caipira (Odeon, 1978) 
 Sol do Meio Dia (ECM, 1978)
 Solo (ECM, 1979)
 Mágico, with Charlie Haden and Jan Garbarek (ECM, 1980) – recorded in 1979
 Circense (EMI, 1980)
 Folk Songs, with Charlie Haden and Jan Garbarek (ECM, 1981)
 Sanfona, with Academia de Dancas (ECM, 1981)[2LP] – recorded in 1980–81
 Em Família (EMI, 1981)
 Fantasia (EMI, 1982)
 Cidade Coração (EMI, 1983)

 Duas Vozes, with Naná Vasconcelos (ECM, 1985) – recorded in 1984
 Trem Caipira (1985)
 Live at Berlin Jazzbühne Jazz Festival (1984) – live
 Alma (1986)
 O Pagador de Promessas (1988)
 Dança dos Escravos (ECM, 1989)
 Feixe de Luz (1988)
 Presents a Musical Childhood with Infância (1990)
 Amazônia (1991)
 Kuarup (Carmo, 1991)
 Infância (ECM, 1991)
 Casa das Andorinhas (1992)
 Música de Sobrevivência (1993)
 Brasil Musical (1993)
 Zig Zag (ECM, 1995)
 Forrobodó (Carmo, 1996)
 Violão (Carmo, 1996)
 Meeting Point (ECM, 1997)
 In Montreal, with Charlie Haden (ECM, 2001) – live recorded in 1989
 Retratos (EMI, 2004)
 Saudações (ECM, 2009)
 Mágico: Carta de Amor, with Jan Garbarek and Charlie Haden (ECM, 2012) – live recorded in 1981

References

External links
Oldies.com
Biography at European Jazz Network

Interview at Brazil-Brasil.com
Egberto Gismonti on ECM Records

20th-century Brazilian musicians
20th-century classical composers
20th-century classical pianists
20th-century guitarists
20th-century jazz composers
20th-century male musicians
21st-century Brazilian musicians
21st-century classical composers
21st-century classical pianists
21st-century guitarists
21st-century jazz composers
21st-century male musicians
1947 births
Brazilian classical composers
Brazilian classical guitarists
Brazilian classical pianists
Brazilian composers
Brazilian jazz composers
Brazilian jazz guitarists
Brazilian jazz pianists
Brazilian male guitarists
Brazilian multi-instrumentalists
Brazilian people of Italian descent
ECM Records artists
Living people
Male classical composers
Male classical pianists
Male jazz composers
Postmodern composers